Thomas David Hodges (born April 5, 1972, in Philadelphia, Pennsylvania) is an American artist, who worked on many Star Wars webcomics, as well as Star Wars Insider article "The Mandalorians: People and Culture" written by Karen Traviss and notable for featuring visual reference on the first female Mandalorian. He also contributed artwork to the book You Can Draw: Star Wars published by DK Publishing.

Hodges also draws other subjects, including Captain America, Lord of the Rings, Rush, and original works.
He is married to Terri Fontana-Hodges, for whom he named the character Vhonte Tervho (the first visual reference of a female Mandalorian). They have a son, Logan, for whom he named the character Drake Lo'gaan.

References

External links

1972 births
Living people
American comics artists
American comics writers
American webcomic creators
Artists from Philadelphia